Jamie Christopher Shannon (born February 26, 1972) is a Canadian actor, voice actor, puppeteer, director, writer and producer, best known for his work in the Canadian television series Nanalan', as well as Ooh, Aah & You, and the Canadian-American television series Mr. Meaty.

Career
Having worked together since teenagers, Shannon and his partner Jason Hopley founded The Grogs puppet company troupe in 1994. Shannon had first developed the idea for The Grogs while traveling in Europe and seeing the prominent place puppets have in street theater. He and Hopley then developed the puppets for children's birthday parties.

Shannon performed three-year-old Mona in the television series, Nanalan'.  He is also known as the performer of 16-year-old Josh in Mr. Meaty and as Swami Jeff in Swami Jeff's Temple of Wisdom.

Shannon is co-creator of Mr. Meaty, along with Jason Hopley. As puppeteers, Shannon and Hopley also created all of the 'Mr. Meaty' puppets, from inception through construction to the final puppet characters.

Shannon's and Hopley's monkey puppets named Ooh and Aah began in early April 2007 as the new hosts of Playhouse Disney.

In the Nicktoons official website, in the Mr. Meaty videos section, there is a "Nick Extra!" where Jamie and Jason show you how to make your very own Mr. Meaty puppet.

Filmography
As actor
 Millennium (1989) as Young Bill Smith
 Stella (1990) as Teenage Heckler
 Hayseed (1997) as Gordie
 Canadian Geographic Kids! (2003–2005) (TV series) as Jamie, host
 Mr. Meaty (21 episodes, 2005–09) (TV series) as Josh Redgrove
 Nanalan' (1998–2007) as Mona
 Swami Jeff's Temple of Wisdom (2008) as Swami Jeff (voice)
 
 As puppeteer
 It's Alive! (1993–1997) (TV series)
 TWIBA, RUBY Big and Small (22 episodes, 2008–2009) (TV series)
 Hotbox (7 episodes, 2009) (TV series)
 Higglety Pigglety Pop! or There Must Be More to Life (V) (2010)
 Swami Jeff (1993–1997) (TV series)
 Mr. Meaty (21 episodes, 2005–09) (TV series)

 As director
 Nanalan' (2003) (TV series)
 Swami Jeff's Temple of Wisdom (2008) (TV series)
 Big & Small (15 episodes, 2009) (TV series)
 GIVER (9 episodes, 2013) (TV series)
 Mr. Meaty (21 episodes, 2005–09) (TV series) 
 Big and Small (22 episodes, 2008–2009) (TV series)

 As writer & producer
 Nanalan' (writer) (2003)
 Mr. Meaty (21 episodes, 2005–09) (TV series) 
 Swami Jeff's Temple of Wisdom (2008) (TV series)

Awards and nominations
 2004, Gemini Award win for 'Best Writing in a Children's or Youth Program or Series'
 2004, Gemini Award win for 'Best Performance in a Pre-School Program or Series'
 2004, Gemini Award nomination for 'Best Pre-School Program or Series'

References

External links
 Jamie Shannon at the Internet Movie Database
 Jamie Shannonwebsite

20th-century Canadian screenwriters
20th-century Canadian male writers
20th-century Canadian male actors
21st-century Canadian screenwriters
21st-century Canadian male writers
21st-century Canadian male actors
Living people
Canadian male voice actors
Canadian television writers
Canadian television directors
Canadian film producers
1972 births
Canadian male television writers